Helicina nemoralis is a species of tropical land snail in the family Helicinidae.

References

 Robinson, D. G., Fields, A. & Zimmerman, F. J. (2004). The terrestrial malacofauna of Trinidad and Tobago. Interim report. 1-21.

External links
 Guppy, R. J. L. (1864). Descriptions of new species of fluviatile and terrestrial operculate Mollusca from Trinidad. The Annals and Magazine of Natural History, 3rd series. 14: 243-248.
 Guppy, R. J. L. (1866). On the terrestrial and fluviatile Mollusca of Trinidad. Annals and Magazine of Natural History, series 3. 17: 42-56.
 Smith, E. A. (1896). A list of the land and freshwater Mollusca of Trinidad. Journal of Conchology. 8: 231-251, pl. 8, London
 Bland, T. (1869). Notes on the land-shells of Trinidad, Grenada and Dominica, and also of Curacao and Buen Ayre, W. I. American Journal of Conchology. 4(4): 177-192
 Bland, T. (1875). Notes on certain terrestrial mollusks, with descriptions of new species. Annals of the Lyceum of Natural History of New York. 11: 72-87
 Guppy, R. J. L. (1872). Third series of additions to the catalogue of the land and freshwater Mollusca of Trinidad: with a revised list of all the species. Proceedings of the Scientific Association of Trinidad. 2(1): 17-25
 Guppy, R. J. L. (1875). On the occurrence of Helix coactiliata in Trinidad; with remarks on the distribution of the land and freshwater Mollusca of that island. Proceedings of the Zoological Society of London. 1875: 318-322
 Guppy, R. J. L. (1875). A list of the land and freshwater shells of Trinidad, showing the distribution of the species. The Quarterly Journal of Conchology. 1(7): 109-110
 Guppy, R. J. L. (1893). The land and freshwater Mollusca of Trinidad. Journal of Conchology. 7: 210-231

Helicinidae